Benjamin Dutton Jr., (April 3, 1883 – November 30, 1937) was a United States Navy Captain, expert navigator and author.

Biography
Benjamin Dutton Jr. was born in Shippensburg, Pennsylvania, on 3 April 1883. He was appointed to the Naval Academy from the 26th District of Pennsylvania in 1901. He served on  until June 1911, and the next month became an instructor at the Naval Academy, where he remained for two years. During 1913 and 1914 he was first lieutenant on board , which operated off the east coast of Mexico.

He was executive officer of the ex-German battleship Osfriesland, which was placed in commission early in 1920 at Rosyth, Scotland, and brought to the United States with the ex-German light cruiser Frankfurt in tow. He was aide and flag secretary to Admiral Hilary P. Jones, commander in chief of United States Fleet in 1922 and in 1923 was ordered to the Naval Academy, where he served as executive officer in the Department of Navigation and later as head of the Department of Electrical Engineering. He was the author of Navigation and Nautical Astronomy used as a textbook at the Naval Academy and in the merchant marine.

He commanded , engaged in surveying the northern coast of Cuba, and was a member of the staff of the Naval War College after completing the Senior Course. He became naval attaché at Berlin, Germany, in May 1935, with additional duty at Oslo, Norway; Copenhagen, Denmark; Stockholm, Sweden; The Hague, the Netherlands; and, after 1935, at Helsingfor, Finland.

Captain Dutton died suddenly on 30 November 1937 at South Gate, California, while in command of Portland.

Works
 Navigation and nautical astronomy. 1926. US Naval Institute.

Namesakes
Two ships of the US Navy have been named in his honor:

See also

References

1883 births
1937 deaths
United States Navy officers
United States Naval Academy alumni
People from Shippensburg, Pennsylvania
Writers from Pennsylvania
Military personnel from Pennsylvania